Three ships of the United States Navy have been named USS Huntington, after the city of Huntington, West Virginia.

  was the renamed  armored cruiser 
  was originally to be a  light cruiser, but was completed as the  light aircraft carrier 
  was a  light cruiser in service from 1946 to 1949

United States Navy ship names